Kurt Willy Oddekalv (27 July 1957 – 11 January 2021) was a Norwegian environmentalist.

Career
He was excluded from Norwegian Society for the Conservation of Nature after a vote at the Annual gathering meeting in 1993.  As a result of this he created his own environmental organization Green Warriors of Norway of which he was the leader until his death.

As a sergeant in the Norwegian military, Oddekalv was the non-commissioned officer in command of the future Norwegian Prime Minister Jens Stoltenberg while the latter was completing his mandatory military service.

Oddekalv revealed in 2015 that he believed in chemtrails, a conspiracy theory that has been strongly criticized by skeptics.

In later years, Oddekalv suffered several strokes and gradually withdrew from the mainstream media.

Oddekalv died on 11 January 2021 after falling through the ice near his home. He was 63 years old.

References

1957 births
2021 deaths
Norwegian environmentalists
People from Senja
Deaths by drowning in Norway
Accidental deaths in Norway